UFC: Fight for the Troops (also known as UFC Fight Night 16) was a mixed martial arts event held by the Ultimate Fighting Championship (UFC) on December 10, 2008, at the Cumberland County Crown Coliseum in Fayetteville, North Carolina.

Background
The event was the first of many the UFC held to support the military. It helped raise money for the Intrepid Fallen Heroes Fund, which provides support for severely wounded military personnel and veterans and the families of military personnel lost in service. The event reportedly raised $4 million during its three-hour broadcast.

The event was officially announced on September 17, 2008 during UFC Fight Night: Diaz vs. Neer.

Razak Al-Hassan replaced Brian Stann against Steve Cantwell on this card. Also, Jim Miller came in with only three weeks notice as a late replacement for Frankie Edgar against Matt Wiman.

The event resulted in an unusual number of serious injuries. Corey Hill, Razak Al-Hassan, Brandon Wolff, Jonathan Goulet, Nate Loughran, and Yoshiyuki Yoshida were all hospitalized for injuries sustained during their fights.

The referees assigned for the event were Dan Miragliotta, Donnie Jessup, Al Coley, and Mario Yamasaki.

Results

Bonus awards
At the end of the night, the UFC awarded $30,000 to each of the fighters who received one of these awards:

Fight of the Night: Jim Miller vs. Matt Wiman
Knockout of the Night: Josh Koscheck
Submission of the Night: Steve Cantwell

See also
 Ultimate Fighting Championship
 List of UFC champions
 List of UFC events
 2008 in UFC

References

External links

UFC Fight Night
2008 in mixed martial arts
Mixed martial arts in North Carolina
Sports in Fayetteville, North Carolina
2008 in North Carolina